Lewis Arthur McConville (December 20, 1849 – May 10, 1882) was a lawyer, journalist and political figure in Quebec. He represented Joliette in the House of Commons of Canada from 1880 to 1882 as a Conservative member.

He was born in Berthier, Canada East (in what is now Saint-Paul, Quebec), the son of John McConville, an Irish immigrant, and Mary McKay. McConville was educated in Joliette and was admitted to the bar in 1871. He served as a member of the editorial staff for Le Nouveau Monde and founded L'Industrie at Joliette in 1876. In 1878, McConville married Josephte-Antonine Tarieu de Lanaudière, the daughter of a co-seigneur of Lavaltrie. He served on the municipal council for Joliette from 1879 to 1882. McConville was first elected to the House of Commons in an 1880 by-election held after Louis François Georges Baby was named to the Quebec Court of Appeal. He died in Joliette at the age of 32 after a short illness.

McConville's wife entered a convent two years after the death of her husband. His brother Joseph-Norbert-Alfred McConville served as a member of the Quebec provincial assembly.

References 
 
The Canadian parliamentary companion and annual register, 1882 CH Mackintosh

1849 births
1882 deaths
Members of the House of Commons of Canada from Quebec
Conservative Party of Canada (1867–1942) MPs
Canadian people of Irish descent